Charles Allan Ellis (1909–1984) was an Australian rugby league footballer who played in the 1930s and 1940s.

Background
Ellis was born in Marrickville, New South Wales on 7 May 1909.

Playing career
Ellis joined the Newtown club, playing six first grade seasons with the club between 1935 and 1940. He also captained the club in his final seasons. 

He is the brother of two other Newtown legends; Keith Ellis and Tom Ellis.

Coaching career
As his brothers did before him, Ellis coached the lower grades at Newtown for many years, including winning a third grade premiership in 1943. He later coached the first grade team between 1962 and 1965. His son, Greg Ellis, also played first grade with the Newtown in the 1950s and 1960s.

Ellis died on 23 September 1984, aged 75.

References

1909 births
1984 deaths
Australian rugby league coaches
Australian rugby league players
Newtown Jets captains
Newtown Jets coaches
Newtown Jets players
Rugby league players from Sydney